List of foods, dishes, and culinary items created or adapted using materials acquired by a culture after the Columbian exchange.

Africa
 Tomato bredie

Europe

Potato
 Gnocchi
 German potato salad
 Hachis Parmentier, a French Mashed potatoes and beef casserole
 Skordalia, a Greek Aioli
 Pommes duchesses
 Gratin dauphinois, a French Potato, Milk and Garlic casserole
 Knedle

Tomatoes
 Pasta sauce
 Bruschetta
 Caprese salad 
 Fried green tomatoes
 Gazpacho
 Porra antequerana
 Paprykarz szczeciński
 Pa amb tomàquet
 Pappa al pomodoro
 Pasta al pomodoro
 Pico de gallo
 Pizza pugliese
 Salmorejo
 Tomato and egg soup
 Tomato omelette
 Trenton tomato pie
 Italian tomato pie
 Southern tomato pie
 Tomato sandwich 
 Tomato and cheese sandwich 
 Tomato soup

Others
 chocolate

European American
 Tomato compote

Middle East
 Shakshouka
 Stuffed tomatoes

East Asia

Chili peppers
 Kung Pao chicken
 Dong'an chicken

Tomatoes
 Stir-fried tomato and scrambled eggs

Southeast Asia
 Sarsiado

Modified after Columbian exchange
 Kimchi, now made using chili peppers

References

Columbian exchange
History of globalization